Sam Johnson (born ) is a rugby union player. A centre, Johnson plays for the Glasgow Warriors and represents Scotland at international level, although born and raised in Australia.

Rugby union career

Amateur career
Johnson first made a name for himself at schoolboy level, representing Queensland Schoolboys and Australia Schoolboys A after winning the Associated Independent Colleges (AIC) competition with St Edmund's College in 2011. His first rugby union club was GPS in Brisbane. He was then to switch codes to Rugby League.

On moving to Scotland, he played for Stirling County when not in use by Glasgow Warriors.

Johnson was drafted to Ayr in the Scottish Premiership for the 2017-18 season.

Johnson has been drafted to Glasgow Hawks in the Scottish Premiership for the 2018-19 season.

Professional career
Johnson returned to rugby union for the 2013–14 season, when he joined the Queensland Reds wider training squad, and returned to his former club GPS.

Johnson impressed the Queensland Reds coaching staff in 2014 as a regular in the midfield for Reds A and GPS, which led to him making his Queensland Reds debut off the bench against the Western Force in Perth.

Johnson then went on to play five matches for Queensland Country in Australia's National Rugby Championship in the season 2014–15.

Johnson made two Super Rugby appearances for the Reds in total and was named on the bench a further three times.

On 28 April 2015, it was announced that Johnson would be joining the Pro12 champions Glasgow Warriors in an initial contract to May 2017.

International career
In October 2018, after qualifying to play for Scotland on residency grounds, he was called up to the senior squad for the Autumn Internationals. He was then named in the squad for the 2019 Six Nations tournament and started in the opening game, a 33–20 win against Italy, to claim his first cap. He scored his first international try in the 13-22 loss to Ireland the next week.

Rugby league career
Johnson played Rugby League for the Gold Coast Titans under-20s after school. His favoured position in rugby league was as a forward in the back row but he was often played at as a back at centre instead and was tagged a utility player. He sometimes played for the Gold Coast Titans' feeder club Tweed Heads Seagulls in New South Wales at this time.

References

External links 
Warriors sign Johnson
Warriors sign Sam Johnson & Greg Peterson

1993 births
Living people
Australian rugby union players
Rugby union centres
Queensland Reds players
Queensland Country (NRC team) players
Glasgow Warriors players
Australian expatriate rugby union players
Australian expatriate sportspeople in Scotland
Expatriate rugby union players in Scotland
Stirling County RFC players
Ayr RFC players
Glasgow Hawks players
Scotland international rugby union players
Scottish rugby union players
Rugby league players from Queensland
Rugby union players from Queensland